This is a comprehensive list of awards and nominations received by British singer Craig David. He has earned 12 awards from 43 nominations.

BET Awards

|-
| Rowspan="2" | 2002 || Rowspan="3" | Craig David || Best New Artist || 
|-
| Best Male R&B Artist || 
|-
| 2017 || Best International Act: Europe || 
|}

Brit Awards

|-
| Rowspan="6" | 2001 || Rowspan="3" | Craig David || British Breakthrough Act || 
|-
| British Male Solo Artist || 
|-
| British Dance Act || 
|-
| Rowspan="2" | "7 Days" || British Single of the Year || 
|-
| British Video of the Year || 
|-
| Rowspan="2" | Born to Do It || Rowspan="2" | British Album of the Year || 
|-
| Rowspan="3" | 2002 || 
|-
| Rowspan="7" | Craig David || British Dance Act || 
|-
| Rowspan="2" | British Male Solo Artist || 
|-
| Rowspan="2" | 2003 || 
|-
| Rowspan="2" | British Urban Act || 
|-
| 2006 || 
|-
| 2017 || Rowspan="2" | British Male Solo Artist || 
|-
| 2019 || 
|}

GAFFA Awards

Denmark GAFFA Awards
Delivered since 1991, the GAFFA Awards are a Danish award that rewards popular music by the magazine of the same name.

!
|-
| 2000
| Himself
| Best Foreign New Act
| 
| style="text-align:center;" |
|-
|}

Goldene Kamera

|-
| 2004 || Craig David || Pop International || 
|}

Grammy Awards

|-
| 2002 || "Fill Me In" || Rowspan="2" | Best Male Pop Vocal Performance || 
|-
| 2003 || "7 Days" || 
|}

Ivor Novello Awards

|-
| Rowspan="3" | 2001 || "7 Days" || Best Contemporary Song || 
|-
| "Woman Trouble"  || Best Dance Single || 
|-
| Craig David  || Songwriter of the Year || 
|}

MOBO Awards

|-
| Rowspan="5" | 2000 || Rowspan="2" | Craig David || Best UK Newcomer || 
|-
| Best R&B Act || 
|-
| "Fill Me In" || Rowspan="2" | Best UK Single of the Year || 
|-
| "Woman Trouble"  || 
|-
| "7 Days" || Best Video || 
|-
| Rowspan="3" | 2001 || Rowspan="2" | Craig David || Best UK Act || 
|-
| Best R&B Act || 
|-
| Born to Do It || Best Album || 
|-
| Rowspan="2" | 2016 || Craig David || Best Male Act || 
|-
| "When the Bassline Drops"  || Best Song || 
|}

MTV Europe Music Award

|-
| 2000 || Rowspan="7" | Craig David || Best UK & Ireland Act || 
|-
| Rowspan="4" | 2001 || Best Male || 
|-
| Best New Act || 
|-
| Best R&B || 
|-
| Best UK & Ireland Act || 
|-
| Rowspan="2" | 2003 || Best Male || 
|-
| Best R&B || 
|}

MTV Video Music Award

|-
| 2001 || "Fill Me In" || MTV2 Award || 
|-
| 2002 || "Walking Away" || Best Male Video || 
|}

Other awards and honors
 Honorary Degree, Doctor of Music, Southampton Solent University, 7 November 2008

References

David, Craig